This is a list of all, including former members of the European Parliament for the Forum for Democracy (FvD). FvD is a Dutch conservative, Eurosceptic party.

Seats in the European Parliament

European Parliament 
Forum for Democracy participated in 2019 one time in the European elections.

Alphabetical

Elected members of the European Parliament (from 1979)
Current members of the European Parliament are in bold.

European Parliament periods

2019-2024 
 

3 seats:
 Derk Jan Eppink (fractievoorzitter)
 Rob Roos
 Rob Rooken

References

Lists of Members of the European Parliament for the Netherlands